C. & E. Fein GmbH is a manufacturer of high-end power tools located near Stuttgart, Germany. Founded in 1867 by brothers Wilhelm Emil Fein and Carl Fein, the company invented the hand-held electric drill in 1895 and was responsible for many other innovations. Fein became famous for its grinders, electric screwdrivers, and Fein Multimaster RS, the original oscillating multitool.

History

In 1867, Wilhelm Emil Fein and his brother Carl founded a "mechanical workshop" in Stuttgart, the company C. & E. Fein. The first products of the company from 1873 were medical inductors. In 1895, Fein invented the electric hand drill, which is considered the forerunner of power tools. The first "drill with electro-pneumatic hammer mechanism" was built in 1914 by the company and applied for a patent. Fein developed the first tin snips and the first jigsaw in 1927. In the 1950s, a handy small drill called "Fein-Zwerg" (Fein-Dwarf) helped boost popularity.

The first power tool with oscillation technology was launched in 1967, at the time as a plaster band cast saw. In 1985, the company's first cordless screwdriver appeared. In 1987, the Fein quick-clamping system QuickIN made the handling of angle grinders considerably safer. In 2007, the company presented a MultiMaster generation with QuickIN and better handling. In 2011, Fein presented the first handheld core drilling system for metal, KBH 25.

External links 
Fein web site
Inside woodworking web site info on Fein tools

References 

German brands
Tool manufacturing companies of Germany
Manufacturing companies based in Stuttgart
Power tool manufacturers
Woodworking hand-held power tools
1867 establishments in Germany
Manufacturing companies established in 1867